József Fellai (born 24 June 1989) is a Hungarian football player who currently plays for Kozármisleny SE.

References 
HLSZ
MLSZ

1989 births
Living people
Sportspeople from Pécs
Hungarian footballers
Association football defenders
Kozármisleny SE footballers
Komlói Bányász SK footballers
Kaposvölgye VSC footballers
Barcsi SC footballers
Lombard-Pápa TFC footballers
Nemzeti Bajnokság I players